The Rod Macqueen Cup is a rugby union trophy contested biannually in Super Rugby between the ACT Brumbies and the Queensland Reds. The Rod Macqueen Cup was introduced in 2005 to celebrate Rod Macqueen, the first Brumbies head coach.

Rod Macqueen

End of the Amateur Era
One of Macqueen's first major coaching positions was at the NSW Waratahs, from 1991 to 1992. In 1992, 1994, and 1995, he was also a selector for the Wallabies, the Australian national team.

ACT Brumbies
Rod Macqueen was the first head coach of the ACT Brumbies in 1996. He led them to the 4th best win-loss record in the competition that year, only missing out on a finals berth due to the Natal Sharks winning a superior number of bonus points. The ACT Brumbies were one of only two teams to beat the Queensland Reds in the regular season. Macqueen's 1996 Brumbies were the only team to beat Queensland, Natal, and the Auckland Blues.

In 1997, Macqueen led the ACT Brumbies to the Grand Final against the Auckland Blues. Joe Roff scored all the Brumbies' points in a 23–7 defeat.

Wallabies Head Coach
Macqueen was appointed the head coach of the Wallabies in September 1997, and would coach them until 2001. He led the Wallabies to victory at the 1999 Rugby World Cup in Wales, where they defeated France in the final, becoming the first nation to ever win the Rugby World Cup twice. The following year Australia won the Tri Nations Series for the first time.

Macqueen retired from the game after guiding the Wallabies to a victory over the highly rated 2001 Lions side captained by Martin Johnson. He finished his career as the Australian coach with a test match winning record of just below 80%. His achievements with the Wallabies led many people to believe that he is one of the talented coaches in the professional era.

Macqueen received an Australian Sports Medal in 2000. was inducted into the Sport Australia Hall of Fame in 2001. and was made a Member of the Order of Australia in 2003. In 2004 he was awarded the Joe French Award, which recognizes outstanding service to the Australian Rugby Union. Macqueen was inducted into the IRB Hall of Fame in October 2011, alongside all other Rugby World Cup-winning head coaches and captains through the 2007 edition.

History of the Rivalry

Super 12 to Super 14 (1996 – 2009)
Despite producing many talented Wallabies in the first fifteen years of professionalism, such as Jason Little, Chris Latham, Toutai Kefu, Tim Horan, Daniel Herbert, Michael Foley, Elton Flatley, John Eales, Dan Crowley, John Roe, Ben Tune, and David Wilson, the Queensland Reds only defeated the ACT Brumbies once in the first fifteen years of their rivalry, with an 19-18 victory at Ballymore Stadium in 1999. 

Queensland's 1999 win was enough to give them a top-of-the-table finish in 1999, and prevented the ACT Brumbies from reaching the playoffs.

The most significant clash in the early rivalry between these teams was the 2001 Semi Final. This was Queensland's last playoff appearance for a decade.

The Rod Macqueen Cup was introduced in 2005 to celebrate Rod Macqueen. The ACT Brumbies were the first to win the Rod Macqueen Cup, and proceeded to retain it all through Super 14.

The end of Super 14 and the start of the Conference System (2010 – 2014)
The four years that Ewen McKenzie, who played for the Brumbies in Super 12, was coach of the Reds was the high water mark of the rivalry. In 2010, 2012, and 2013, the Rod Macqueen Cup games decided whether either the Brumbies or the Reds made the playoff. In 2010, the Rod Macqueen Cup game was the difference between the Reds finishing 4th (in the playoffs) and 5th (not in the playoffs). In 2012 and 2013, if the losing team had won just one of the Rod Macqueen Cup games, they would have won the conference ahead of the other.

In 2011, the Queensland Reds won their second game against the Brumbies. Despite scoring four tries, the Brumbies were only able to convert one, while Quade Cooper kicked seven penalty goals, a drop goal, and converted the Reds' only try for an individual haul of 26 points, enough to beat the Brumbies on his own, and more points in a game than any Brumby has ever scored.

However, the Reds were unable to win the Rod Macqueen Cup in 2011, as the Brumbies won a famous underdog victory in the return game. The Brumbies were in the middle of their worst season, while the Reds would win the 2011 Super Rugby Final, and yet the Brumbies played one of the best defensive performances of the season to continually frustrate the Reds and prevent them from playing their game. The game ended in controversy when the Brumbies won a penalty after the siren. Brumbies captain Matt Giteau chose to attempt the penalty goal, while Stephen Moore, a former Queensland Red, told Giteau to kick it out so the Reds could have the losing bonus point for finishing within seven points. Giteau was clearly heard on the broadcast telling Moore "f**k off, I'm the captain.", which many fans consider to be illustrative of both men's captaincies: Giteau the authoritarian, Moore too nice to his opposition.

The Reds won the Rod Macqueen Cup for the first time in 2012, beating the Brumbies in Canberra and in Brisbane to win as many games against the Brumbies in one year as they had in their entire history. However, the Brumbies won it back with a win and a draw in 2013. The draw in 2013 was played in front of the largest crowd to ever watch a Rod Macqueen Cup game, a testament to the status of the rivalry at that time.

The captains and coaches (Ben Mowen and Jake White for the Brumbies, and James Horwill and Ewen McKenzie for the Reds) all considered Rod Macqueen Cup games of 2010–2013 to be of a test standard.

Era of Home Ground Advantage (2015 – Present)

The Brumbies retained the Rod Macqueen Cup from 2013 to 2020. However, unlike the early years of Super Rugby, the fixture is now regularly won by the home team, with neither of the teams winning away from home between 2015 and 2020. The Reds broke this streak in 2021, when they beat the Brumbies in Canberra.

In 2020, the Reds began to threaten for the top spot in Australian rugby. Despite losing five of their seven games before the season was cancelled due to the COVID-19 pandemic, the Reds were incredibly competitive against the Brumbies, the Crusaders, and the Sharks, who were all considered favourites to win their own conference and to make the final. Commentators and pundits pointed to the four 2020 Brumbies-Reds games as "[improving] the standard of Australian Rugby", with a sense of excitement due to "both teams [having] a great chance of winning it" each time.

The Reds delivered on their potential in the Australian resumption of Super Rugby, only losing two of their eight games and reaching the final against the Brumbies.

In 2021, the Reds won the Rod Macqueen Cup for the second time, beating the Brumbies 40 – 38 in Canberra, and 24 – 22 in Brisbane. The games between the teams in 2021 were generally considered "thrillers" that "exceeded all expectations as a spectacle". Pundits consider that the majority of players for the Wallabies in 2021 will come from the Reds or the Brumbies, noting that this would be a first since 1999.

The Reds won the 2021 Super Rugby AU season, beating the Brumbies 19 – 16 in Brisbane.

Notable players for both teams
Several players have had successful periods playing for both clubs, including:

As of 25 September 2021. 
Players in bold are still playing for one of the two teams.

Rod Macqueen Cup Results
{| class="wikitable"
|align=center bgcolor=#FFE6BD|Brumbies Win
|align=center bgcolor=#ff99a0|Reds Win
|align=center bgcolor=#e0e0e0|Draw
|}

References

Rugby union rivalries
2005 establishments in Australia
Recurring sporting events established in 2005
Super Rugby
ACT Brumbies
Queensland Reds
Sports rivalries in Australia